Clint Brink (born 29 September 1980) is a South African actor. He is best known for his roles in the films King Dog, Ellen: Die storie van Ellen Pakkies and Lockdown Heights as well as the soap opera Binnelanders.

Early
Brink was born in Paarl, Cape Province (now Western Cape). He attended New Orleans High School. He went on to graduate with a Bachelor of Arts in Film and Television from CityVarsity School of Media and Creative Arts in 1999.

Career

During his studies, Brink worked on several short films. At the age of 19 after graduation, he auditioned for the film Gangsters and dancers. Unfortunately, the film was cancelled before its production. However, he landed the role of Shaun Jacobs in the television series Backstage. He then appeared in the soap opera Generations as 'Bradley Paulse'. He also starred in several South African films such as Dollars and White Pipes, Swop! and Mega Python vs. Gatoroid.

In 2006, he was nominated for the South African Film and Television Award (SAFTA) for Best Actor in a Feature Film for his role in the blockbuster film Dollars + White Pipes. In 2007 he starred as Valentino "Tino" Martens in the series Scandal!. For his performance, he earned SAFTAs for Best Actor and Best Supporting Actor in a TV Soap.

Personal life

In 2000, Brink began dating fellow actress Marubini Mogale. In 2002, Brink, Mogale, and Mogale's sister Lerato were in a car together. The driver lost control and the car overturned; Marubini died while Brink and Lerato sustained minor injuries.

Brink married Steffi van Wyk, a Namibian model and beauty pageant winner, in 2016.

Filmography

References

External links

 
 Clint on the Brink!
 Clint Brink Reveals Why He Left The Entertainment Industry
 Brink is more than just a pretty face
 It's only been God's grace - actor Clint Brink on turning 40

Living people
1980 births
21st-century South African male actors
People from Mpumalanga
People from Paarl
South African male film actors
South African male television actors